31–33 The Shambles is an historic trio of buildings in the English city of York, North Yorkshire. Grade II listed, parts of the structures date to the early 15th century, with alterations occurring in the 19th century.

References 

31
Houses in North Yorkshire
15th-century establishments in England
Grade II listed buildings in York
Grade II listed houses
15th century in York